Bismarck is a village in Newell Township, Vermilion County, Illinois, United States. It is part of the Danville, Illinois Metropolitan Statistical Area. The population was 579 at the 2010 census.

History
The original settlement in this immediate area was to the west of Bismarck's location, where the Hubbard Trail and the North Fork of the Vermilion River crossed. It was originally called Franklin when it was founded in 1837, but it lasted only a few years. Later, in 1843, Brothers John and Samuel Myers built a mill near the site of Franklin, and a town called Myersville later grew up there.

In 1872, the C&EI Railroad went through the area; the tracks did not go through Myersville, but passed one and a half miles to the east. Gradually, the town moved toward the railroad on land donated by Charles S. Young and Dr. John B. Holloway. Young named the town Bismarck after the German statesman and chancellor Otto von Bismarck, whom he admired.

On September 13, 1997, the community celebrated its 125th birthday. Festivities, which were attended by about 2,000 people, included a parade, contests, historical exhibits at the local grade school, and multiple performances.

In 1998, the village of Bismarck was incorporated. The members of the first village board were Mayor Eleanor White, Julie Boersma, Pat Kentner, Chuck Mockbee, Lyle Milner, Diane Holycross, Don Evans, Alvina Van Pelt, and Betty Lewis.

Geography
Bismarck is located at  (40.262371, -87.609876), about eight miles north of the county seat of Danville.

Education

Public schools include Bismarck Henning Grade School, Bismarck Henning Junior High School, and Bismarck Henning High School.

Demographics

As of the census of 2000, there were 542 people, 204 households, and 158 families residing in the village. The racial makeup of the village was 99.63% White, 0.18% Native American, and 0.18% from two or more races.

There were 204 households, out of which 42.2% had children under the age of 18 living with them, 69.6% were married couples living together, 7.4% had a female householder with no husband present, and 22.5% were non-families. 19.6% of all households were made up of individuals, and 11.3% had someone living alone who was 65 years of age or older. The average household size was 2.66 and the average family size was 3.08.

In the village, the population was spread out, with 27.9% under the age of 18, 5.9% from 18 to 24, 30.6% from 25 to 44, 23.6% from 45 to 64, and 12.0% who were 65 years of age or older. The median age was 37 years. For every 100 females, there were 97.1 males. For every 100 females age 18 and over, there were 88.9 males.

The median income for a household in the village was $41,731, and the median income for a family was $45,000. Males had a median income of $36,750 versus $21,667 for females. The per capita income for the village was $15,255. About 3.4% of families and 4.2% of the population were below the poverty line, including 6.9% of those under age 18 and none of those age 65 or over.

References

Villages in Vermilion County, Illinois
Villages in Illinois
Populated places established in 1873